The Kızılırmak (Turkish for "Red River"), once known as the Halys River and Alis River, is the longest river flowing entirely within Turkey. It is a source of hydroelectric power and is not used for navigation.

Geography 

There are dams on the river at Boyabat, Altınkaya and Derbent.

History
The Hittites called the river the Maraššantiya, and it formed the western boundary of Hatti, the core land of the Hittite empire.

Until the Roman conquest of Anatolia the Halys River (later renamed the Kızılırmak by the Turkish conquerors) served as a natural political boundary in central Asia Minor, first between the kingdom of Lydia and the Persian Empire, and later between the Pontic Kingdom and the Kingdom of Cappadocia. As the site of the Battle of Halys, or the Battle of the Eclipse, on May 28, 585 BC, the river formed the border between Lydia to the west and Media to the east until Croesus of Lydia crossed it to attack Cyrus the Great in 547 BC. He was defeated and Persia expanded to the Aegean Sea.

In the 1st century AD Vespasian combined several provinces, including Cappadocia, to create one large province with its eastern boundary marked by the Euphrates River. This province once again splintered during Trajans reign - the newly created province of Cappadocia, bounded by the Euphrates to the East, included Pontus and Lesser Armenia. The Halys River became an interior river and never regained its significance as a political border. In the 130s a governor of Cappadocia wrote: "long ago the Halys River was the boundary between the kingdom of Croesus and the Persian Empire; now it flows under Roman dominion."

Agriculture

The river's water is used to grow rice and in a few areas water buffalo are kept.

In popular culture
The historical fiction manga Red River is named after and largely set in the Kızılırmak basin, during the age of the Hittites.

References

External links
Livius.org: Halys - Photos
sdu.dk/halys
List of rivers of Turkey

Rivers of Turkey
Halys River
Ramsar sites in Turkey
Landforms of Samsun Province
Landforms of Çorum Province
Landforms of Çankırı Province
Landforms of Aksaray Province
Landforms of Ankara Province
Landforms of Kırıkkale Province
Landforms of Kırşehir Province
Landforms of Nevşehir Province
Landforms of Kayseri Province
Landforms of Sivas Province